The Laser Standard or ILCA 7 is a popular one-design class of single-handed sailing dinghy, originally built by Performance Sailcraft Canada. The laser is cat rigged, with a single mainsail and is a simple, light and fast boat to sail. The Laser Standard is the original of the Laser family of dinghys, which also includes the Laser Radial and Laser 4.7, both of which use the same hull, but have smaller rigs.

Events

Olympics

World Championship

References

External links

Similar vessels

RS Aero

Class associations
International Laser Class Association
Laser Class Association of India (LCAI)
UK Laser Association
Laser Class North America
Argentinian Laser Class

Others
 ISAF Laser Microsite
 ISAF Laser Radial Microsite
ISAF Laser 4.7 Microsite
LASER XD Sailing Guide

Laser (dinghy)